The 1991 East Carolina Pirates football team represented East Carolina University in the 1991 NCAA Division I-A football season. The Pirates offense scored 409 points while the defense allowed 277 points. Led by head coach Bill Lewis, the Pirates won the Peach Bowl defeating in-state rival NC State.

Schedule

Roster

Rankings

Game summaries

at Illinois

at Syracuse

Pittsburgh

vs. NC State (Peach Bowl)

Team players drafted into the NFL

Awards and honors
 Bill Lewis, AFCA Coach of the Year

References

East Carolina
East Carolina Pirates football seasons
Peach Bowl champion seasons
East Carolina Pirates football